Elmo the Fearless is a 1920 American silent action adventure film serial directed by J. P. McGowan and starring Elmo Lincoln and Louise Lorraine. The film is now considered to be lost.

Cast
 Elmo Lincoln as The Stranger
 Louise Lorraine as Edith Stillwell
 William N. Chapman as Robert Stillwell (credited as William Chapman)
 Ray Watson as Paul Horton
 Frank Ellis as Dan Bulger
 V. L. Barnes as Checko
 Gordon McGregor as Guy Hatherton
 J. P. McGowan
 Monte Montague

Chapter titles
 The Wreck of the Santiam
 The Racing Death
 The Life Line
 The Flames of Death
 The Smugglers' Cave
 The Battle Under the Sea
 The House of Mystery
 The Fatal Crossing
 The Assassin's Knife
 The Fatal Bullet
 The Temple of the Dragon
 Crashing Through
 The Hand on the Latch
 The Avalanche
 The Burning Fuse
 The House of Intrigue
 The Trap
 The Fatal Letter (alternate title: The Fateful Letter)

See also
 List of American films of 1920
 List of film serials
 List of film serials by studio

References

External links

 
 

1920 films
1920 lost films
American silent serial films
American action adventure films
Silent action adventure films
Lost action adventure films
American black-and-white films
Films directed by J. P. McGowan
Lost American films
Universal Pictures film serials
1920s American films